Saira Iftikhar (Punjabi) is a Pakistani politician who was a Member of the Provincial Assembly of the Punjab, from May 2013 to May 2018.

Early life and education
She was born in Karachi.

She has earned the degree of Master of Arts in English and bachelor's degree in Advance Management from Hamburger University.

Political career

She was elected to the Provincial Assembly of the Punjab as a candidate of Pakistan Muslim League (N) on a reserved seat for women in 2013 Pakistani general election.

References

Living people
Punjabi people
Women members of the Provincial Assembly of the Punjab
Punjab MPAs 2013–2018
Pakistan Muslim League (N) politicians
Year of birth missing (living people)
21st-century Pakistani women politicians